Nasri Abu Jaish Abu Jaish (born 20 April 1967) is a Palestinian dentist, politician, diplomat and lecturer who holds a PhD in developmental studies and political science. He is the Labor Minister in the 18th Palestinian government. He is a member of the Palestinian National Council.

Background 
Nasri Khalil Salim was born in the village of Beit Dajan in Nablus Governorate in the West Bank on 20 April 1967, where he received his elementary and preparatory education in the village schools, and secondary in the Qadri Touqan School in Nablus. Then he began his university education in Sofia to obtain a bachelor's degree in dentistry, and later obtained a diploma in protocol from Jakarta. Nasri Abu Jaish completed his university studies at the University of Dar es Salaam in Tanzania to obtain a master's degree in international relations, as well as a doctorate in development studies and political science from the universities of Dar es Salaam and Harari.

Positions 
Nasri Abu Jaish was included in diplomatic and political life, where he held the posts of Ambassador of the State of Palestine to Seychelles, Mauritius, Tanzania, Ethiopia, Kenya, and Uganda. On 13 April 2019, Abu Jaish was sworn in front of Palestinian President Mahmoud Abbas as Minister of Labor in the government of Muhammad Shtayyeh.

References 

Living people
Government ministers of the State of Palestine
1967 births
Palestinian dentists
People from Nablus Governorate
Labor ministers of Palestine

Ambassadors of the State of Palestine to Ethiopia
Ambassadors of the State of Palestine to Uganda
Ambassadors of the State of Palestine to Tanzania
Ambassadors of the State of Palestine to Seychelles
Ambassadors of the State of Palestine to Kenya
Ambassadors of the State of Palestine to Mauritius
Palestinian expatriates in Indonesia
Palestinian expatriates in Bulgaria